Nora Schaefer (born July 19, 1993) is a German female acrobatic gymnast. With partners Luise Zscheile and Franca Schamber, Schaefer competed in the 2014 Acrobatic Gymnastics World Championships.

References

1993 births
Living people
German acrobatic gymnasts
Female acrobatic gymnasts